Treasures of Madison County is a museum in Madison, Madison County, Florida. The museum is located in the historic W. T. Davis Building at 200 Southwest Range Avenue. The building has a metal front, one of just three remaining in the state of Florida according to the Treasures of Madison County website.

The building was added to the National Register of Historic Places on March 17, 2015.

Gallery

References

External links
Treasures of Madison County website

Museums in Madison County, Florida
History museums in Florida